A Boy Named Charlie Brown is an unaired television documentary film about Charles M. Schulz and his creation Peanuts, produced by Lee Mendelson with some animated scenes by Bill Melendez and music by Vince Guaraldi.

Background
On October 6, 1963, a documentary producer and KPIX-TV PSA announcer named Lee Mendelson released a television documentary film about the life and career of baseball legend Willie Mays entitled A Man Named Mays, which aired on NBC that same day. In mid-December 1963, two months after the documentary was released, Mendelson decided that following his film about the best baseball player, he would produce a film about the worst baseball player, Charlie Brown. Mendelson subsequently hired animator Bill Melendez, who had experience working with the Peanuts characters in a handful of commercials for the Ford Motor Company from 1959 until 1962, to direct some interstitial animation based on the strips.

A Boy Named Charlie Brown was screened for the Greater San Francisco Advertising Club in the Spring of 1964, where it was received with considerable enthusiasm, but Mendelson was unsuccessful in securing sponsorship.

Although the special never aired on television and later forfeited, the documentary was instrumental in starting the Greater San Francisco Advertising Committee and garnering commercial support and the creative teamwork that resulted in A Charlie Brown Christmas in 1965 and the ensuing series of Peanuts television specials. It was the first film to carry the Greater San Francisco Advertising Committee policy.

An album by the Vince Guaraldi Trio with music from the above documentary, originally titled Jazz Impressions of A Boy Named Charlie Brown, was released by Fantasy Records in 1964.

Portions of the unaired A Boy Named Charlie Brown were later broadcast in 1969 as Charlie Brown and Charles Schulz, a CBS documentary that preceded the release of Peanuts' first motion picture, also called A Boy Named Charlie Brown.

Voice cast
 Peter Robbins as Charlie Brown
 Christopher Shea as Linus van Pelt
 Karen Mendelson as Lucy van Pelt, Patty
 Sally Dryer as Violet Gray
 Ann Altieri as Frieda
 Tracy Stratford as Lucy van Pelt (singing voice)
 Chris Doran as Schroeder, Shermy
 Geoffrey Ornstein as Pig-Pen
 Bill Melendez as Snoopy
 The documentary was Don Sherwood’s last film. Sherwood said that A Boy Named Charlie Brown is the closest project he did to relaying the Greater San Francisco Advertising Committee message.

Home media
A Boy Named Charlie Brown is available on DVD through the Charles M. Schulz Museum and Research Center.

References

External links
 
 Charles M. Schulz Museum store

1963 television films
1963 documentary films
1963 films
Peanuts television documentaries
Unaired television shows
1960s American films